The Transit Areas Management Regiment is a military logistics regiment of the Italian Army based in Bellinzago Novarese and Bari. The regiment is operationally assigned to the Logistic Support Command and manages the reception, staging and onward movement of equipment, personnel, and materiel from Italy to Italian military operations abroad. The unit was formed on 1 January 2015 by reorganizing and expanding the 1st Transport Regiment and together with the 6th General Logistic Support Regiment provides third line logistic support for the army's brigades and Rapid Deployable Corps – Italy.

History 
In 1963 the Italian Army reorganized its divisions and created autonomous brigades under a division's command. Consequently on 1 September 1963 the III Services Battalion "Centauro" was formed in Bellinzago Novarese to support the Armored Division "Centauro"'s III Brigade. On 1 October 1968 the brigades of the divisions were disbanded and the III Services Battalion was assigned to the division's Services Grouping "Centauro".

During the 1975 army reform the army disbanded the regimental level and newly independent battalions were granted for the first time their own flags. On 1 January 1976 the III Services Battalion was renamed Logistic Battalion "Curtatone" and assigned to the 31st Armored Brigade "Curtatone". On 12 November 1976 the President of the Italian Republic Giovanni Leone issued decree 846, which granted the new units their flags.

Initially the battalion consisted of a command, a command platoon, a transport and supply company, a medium workshop, and a vehicles park. On 1 October 1981 the battalion as reorganized and now consisted of a command, a command and services company, a supply company, a maintenance company, a medium transport company. On 1 October 1986 the Italian Army abolished the divisional level and the Armored Division "Centauro" was disbanded and the division's name and traditions passed to 31st Armored Brigade "Curtatone", which was renamed 31st Armored Brigade "Centauro". Therefore on 1 May 1987 the Logistic Battalion "Curtatone" was renamed Logistic Battalion "Centauro".

On 1 February 2001 the battalion was transferred to the Logistic Projection Brigade. On 24 September 2001 the battalion was reorganized as 1st Transport Regiment and consisted now of a regimental command, a command and logistic support company, a transport battalion, and a movement control battalion. On 12 September 2013 the Logistic Projection Command was disbanded and the 1st Transport Regiment was assigned to the army's Logistic Support Command. In 2015 the regiment was reorganized and renamed Transit Areas Management Regiment.

Current structure 
As of 2022 the Transit Areas Management Regiment consists of:

  Regimental Command, in Bellinzago Novarese
 Command and Logistic Support Company
 Logistic Battalion, in Bellinzago Novarese
 Logistic Battalion, in Bari
 Transit Areas Management Battalion, in Bellinzago Novarese
 Transit Areas Management Battalion, in Bari

The Command and Logistic Support Company fields the following platoons: C3 Platoon, Transport and Materiel Platoon, Medical Platoon, and Commissariat Platoon.

See also 
 Military logistics

External links
Italian Ministry of Defense Website: Reggimento Gestione Aree di Transito

References 

Logistic Regiments of Italy